James Tootle (22 April 1899–1947) was an English footballer who played in the Football League for Derby County and Southport.

References

1899 births
1947 deaths
English footballers
Association football defenders
English Football League players
Skelmersdale United F.C. players
Southport F.C. players
Derby County F.C. players
Chester City F.C. players